ProjeKct X was a side project of the music band King Crimson during 1999–2000.

In 2000, while the band King Crimson recorded their album the construKction of light, the four members of this line-up also recorded the album Heaven and Earth as ProjeKct X. The line-up consisted of Robert Fripp on Guitar, Adrian Belew on Guitar and V-Drums, Trey Gunn on Warr Guitar, and Pat Mastelotto on traps and "buttons" (electronic percussion and loops).

This continued the tradition of ProjeKcts One, Two, Three, and Four (sub-groups into which King Crimson 'fraKctalised' from 1997 to 1999).
Heaven and Earth is an album by ProjeKct X released in 2000 on the DGM label in the US and Germany and Pony Canyon in Japan  The title track later appeared as the last track on the construKction of light.

Track listing

 "The Business of Pleasure" – 2:45
 "Hat in the Middle" – 3:44
 "Side Window" – 3:09
 "Maximizer" – 6:31
 "Strange Ears (aging rapidly)" – 9:39
 "Overhead Floor Mats Under Toe" – 5:47
 "Six O'Clock" – 4:10
 "Superbottomfeeder" – 8:08
 "One E And" – 3:08
 "Two Awkward Moments" – 1:11
 "Demolition" – 7:08
 "Conversation Pit" – 2:11
 "Çin Alayı" – 1:58
 "Heaven and Earth" – 8:19
 "Belew Jay Way" – 5:02

All titles written by: Adrian Belew, Robert Fripp, Trey Gunn and Pat Mastelotto

Personnel
Adrian Belew — Guitar and additional 'V Drumming' on Side Window
Robert Fripp — Guitar and Soundscapes
Trey Gunn — Bass Touch Guitar and Baritone Guitar
Pat Mastelotto — Traps and Buttons

Technical
Recorded by: Ken Latchney and Bill Munyon 
Digital engineering and arranging by Bill Munyon 
Produced and mixed by: Pat Mastelotto and Bill Munyon 
Mixed at: Blue World, Ade's Garage, and Pat's Garage 
Mastered by: Alex R Mundy and Robert Fripp at DGM HQ
Art direction by: Ioannis for Vivid Images Worldwide, LLC, Design by: Alan Chappell for Vivid Images Worldwide 
Digital art by Ioannis 
Video Images & Photographs by Trey Gunn
Conversations, InstruKctions and wordgames by ProjeKct X
Recorded during the rehearsals and recording of the ConstruKction of Light by King Crimson at StudioBelew. 
Additional recording at: Ade's Garage, Pat's Garage, and The Apartment.

References

ProjeKcts
2000 albums